Karn City Area School District is a public school district in Butler County, Clarion County, and Armstrong County, Pennsylvania. The district serves the boroughs of Chicora, Fairview, Karns City, Petrolia, and Bruin and the townships of Parker, Fairview, and Donegal in Butler County, the townships of Perry, Sugarcreek, and Bradys Bend in Armstrong County, and the borough of East Brady and Brady Township in Clarion County. There are two K-6 elementary schools- Chicora and Sugarcreek Elementaries, as well as Karns City Junior-Senior High School. According to 2000 federal census data, it serves a resident population of 10,720.

Schools
 Chicora Elementary School
 Sugarcreek Elementary School
 Karns City Area Junior/Senior High School

References

External links
 

School districts in Butler County, Pennsylvania
School districts in Armstrong County, Pennsylvania
Education in Pittsburgh area
School districts in Clarion County, Pennsylvania
School districts established in 1994